The Elections Act 1958 is a Malaysian law which enacted to provide for the elections to the Dewan Rakyat and Dewan Undangan Negeri.

Structure
The Elections Act 1958, in its current form (1 December 2011), consists of 6 Parts containing 17 sections and no schedule (including 19 amendments).
 Part I: Preliminary
 Section 1: Short title
 Section 2: Interpretation
 Part II: Supervision of Elections
 Section 3: Appointments of officers
 Section 3A: General powers and duties of Secretary, Deputy Secretary and Assistant Secretaries
 Section 4: Powers of officers
 Section 5: General powers and duties of Election Commission 
 Part III: Constituencies
 Section 6: (Deleted)
 Section 7: Polling districts and polling centres
 Part IV: Registration of Electors
 Section 8: Appointment of officers
 Section 9: Preparation, publication and revision of electoral rolls
 Section 9A: Certified or re-certified electoral roll shall be deemed to be final
 Section 10: Registration in one constituency only
 Section 11: (Deleted)
 Part V: Conduct of Elections
 Section 12: Writs of election
 Section 13: Election of candidates
 Section 14: Use of schools and public buildings and premises as polling centres
 Part VI: Regulations
 Section 15: Power to make regulations relating to the registration of electors
 Section 16: Power to make regulations relating to the conduct of elections
 Section 17: Regulations to be laid before the Dewan Rakyat

Footnotes

References

External links
 Elections Act 1958 

1958 in Malayan law
Malaysian federal legislation
Elections in Malaysia